Peter Frederik Suhm (18 October 1728 – 7 September 1798), was a Danish historian.

Biography
Suhm studied at the University of Copenhagen from 1746 to 1751, and one of his teachers was Ludvig Holberg. In 1749 he translated a comedy of Plautus and a French theatrical piece.

In 1751 he traveled to Trondheim together with the Danish historian Gerhard Schøning, with whom he continued to collaborate over the following years. Together they produced  (Improvements to the old Danish-Norwegian History) in 1757. In Trondheim he married Karen Angell (1732–1788) 19 April 1752. She was the daughter and only inheritor of a wealthy Norwegian merchant Lorents Angell who had died the previous year. Karen Angells mother accepted the connection on the condition that they stayed in Trondheim for the remainder of her life. Suhm accepted, and stayed on in Trondheim, with a short interval in Copenhagen in 1755, for the next nine years, where she died and Suhm and his wife moved back to Copenhagen. The inherited wealth allowed Suhm a life devoted to the sciences and his book collection.

Schöning and Suhm, together with Johan Ernst Gunnerus, founded the Royal Norwegian Society of Sciences and Letters in 1760 under the name  (the Trondheim Society). From 1761 it published academic papers in a series titled Skrifter. It was the northernmost scientific society in the world.

Suhm published  (five volumes) from 1761 to 1765. In 1771 he published .  (1776) was used in the 19th century as a handbook of history. From 1782 to 1793 he published the first seven volumes of his detailed history of Denmark.

Suhm was a chairman of the Danish Academy of Sciences. In 1779 he became a member of the Royal Swedish Academy of Sciences.

In October 1788 he made second marriage with Christiane Becker (1764–1799), daughter of Johann Gottfried Becker (1723–1790) and Anna Christina Torm (1738–1809).

Suhm was also a book collector. His collection was comprised about 100 000 volumes. In 1775 he opened his library for the public use. In 1796 Moldenhawer purchased his collection for the Royal Danish Library on the condition that the payment would continue in the form of an annuity for Suhm and his wife, but both died shortly after the purchase was completed.

He is buried in the crypt of the Christian's Church in Copenhagen. Suhmsgade in Copenhagen is named after him.

Legacy
Suhmsgade in Copenhagen is named after him.

References

Further reading 

 Terje Bratberg: Artikel „Peter Frederik Suhm“. In: Norsk biografisk leksikon
 H. F. Rørdam: Artikel „Suhm, Peter Frederik“. In: Dansk biografisk Lexikon Band 16. Kopenhagen 1902. p. 558–570.

1728 births
1798 deaths
18th-century Danish historians
Danish book and manuscript collectors